There were 3 triathlon events at the 2018 South American Games in Cochabamba, Bolivia. One each for men and women and a mixed relay event. The events were held between May 29 and 30 at the Laguna La Angostura. This event was a qualification event for the 2019 Pan American Games in Lima, Peru, where the top mixed relay teams qualified.

Medal summary

Medal table

Medallists

See also
Triathlon at the 2019 Pan American Games – Qualification

References

External links
Results

2018 South American Games events
2018
2018 South American Games
Qualification tournaments for the 2019 Pan American Games
2018 in triathlon